Something Rotten! is a musical comedy with a book by John O'Farrell and Karey Kirkpatrick and music and lyrics by Karey and Wayne Kirkpatrick. Set in 1595, the story follows the Bottom brothers, Nick and Nigel, who struggle to find success in the theatrical world as they compete with the wild popularity of their contemporary William Shakespeare.

Something Rotten! opened on Broadway at the St. James Theatre on April 22, 2015, where it played for 708 performances. It was nominated for ten Tony Awards, including Best Musical, and won one (Christian Borle as Best Featured Actor in a Musical). Tours and international productions have followed.

Background
The musical began with an idea that brothers Karey and Wayne Kirkpatrick had had since the 1990s. They finally joined with John O’Farrell to write several songs and presented those songs and a treatment to the producer Kevin McCollum in 2010. The team then joined with Casey Nicholaw, who brought in several of the actors, resulting in the workshop in 2014.

Something Rotten! was expected to have a pre-Broadway tryout at the 5th Avenue Theatre, Seattle, Washington, in April 2015. However, when a Broadway theatre became available, Kevin McCollum decided to open the show without the Seattle tryout. "David Armstrong, artistic director of 5th Avenue Theater, said ... that after the positive buzz surrounding the musical’s workshop in October [2014], he and Mr. McCollum began discussing the possibility of the show bypassing Seattle in favor of Broadway." The developmental lab took place in New York City in October 2014 with Casey Nicholaw as director and choreographer.

Productions

Broadway (2015–2017) 
Something Rotten! opened on Broadway at the St. James Theatre in previews on March 23, 2015, and officially opened on April 22, directed and choreographed by Casey Nicholaw, with the sets designed by Scott Pask, costumes by Gregg Barnes and lighting by Jeff Croiter. The production closed on January 1, 2017 after 742 performances.  It was nominated for ten Tony Awards, including Best Musical, and won one (Christian Borle as Best Featured Actor in a Musical).

US national tours (2017–2019) 
The show launched a US national tour with previews at Proctors Theatre in Schenectady, New York on January 10, 2017, before officially opening at the Boston Opera House on January 17. The tour cast featured Rob McClure (Nick Bottom), Adam Pascal (Shakespeare) and Josh Grisetti (Nigel Bottom).

The show also launched a Non-Equity national tour beginning on September 19, 2018 at the RiverCenter for the Performing Arts in Columbus, Georgia. The tour starred Matthew Janisse (Nick Bottom), Matthew Baker (Shakespeare), and Richard Spitaletta (Nigel Bottom) and was staged by Steve Bebout (associate director of the original Broadway production). In June 2019, the show played a short run of June 9–30 at the Chungmu Art Center Grand Theater in Seoul, Korea, marking the final destination on the tour.

Karlstad, Sweden (2018–2019) 
A Swedish-language production ran from November 8, 2018 to March 3, 2019 at the Wermland Opera in Karlstad, Sweden, directed by Markus Virta. The translation was by Calle Norlén.

Seoul (2020) 
A South Korean production in Korean was scheduled to run from 7 August 2020 to 18 October 2020 at the Chungmu Art Center Grand Theater. Some of the performances were cancelled due to the Covid-19 pandemic.

Synopsis

Act I
The musical opens with the Minstrel welcoming the audience to the English Renaissance ("Welcome to the Renaissance"). He tells the audience that "not everybody is getting what he wants", referring to Nick Bottom, who runs a theatre troupe with his brother Nigel. They are rehearsing for their upcoming play "Richard II", while William Shakespeare (referred to as "the Bard") is opening Romeo and Juliet. Lord Clapham, a patron who trusts the brothers and raises funds for their troupe, enters to announce that Shakespeare is doing Richard II. The news outrages Nick, as Shakespeare has already done Richard III, and the thought of going backwards seems absurd to him. He rants about his hatred of Shakespeare to the troupe members, who are horrified ("God, I Hate Shakespeare"). Lord Clapham leaves, telling the brothers he is stopping their funds unless they have another play by the next morning.

Nigel and Nick go home to their small house, and on the way Nick encounters Shylock the Jew. Shylock expresses a desire to help fund the troupe, but Nick rejects him as it is illegal to employ a Jew. Bea, Nick's wife, tells them the events of her day and how she acquired their dinner as she serves it. They are saving for a better life, and when Nick tries to open the Money Box, Bea smacks his hand away. Bea tells him how she could help them out, but Nick is ambivalent ("Right Hand Man"). Despite Nick's arguments, Bea goes out to do jobs that Nick claims are for men. As Nigel sleeps, Nick faces the real reason he hates Shakespeare: "the Bard" makes Nick feel self-conscious ("God, I Hate Shakespeare (Reprise)"). He wishes there was a way to top Shakespeare, and steals from the Money Box to see a soothsayer. He finds a soothsayer named Thomas Nostradamus (the nephew of the famous soothsayer Nostradamus). Nick asks him what the next big thing in theatre will be, and Nostradamus says that it will be "a musical", a play where "an actor is saying his lines, and out of nowhere he just starts singing". Nick thinks it is ridiculous but quickly warms up to the idea ("A Musical").

Later, Nick meets Nigel on the street. Nigel has just met Portia, the daughter of Brother Jeremiah; they immediately fall in love. Nick tells him that he shouldn't pursue her because she is a Puritan. The Puritans leave and Nick tells Nigel what the soothsayer said, but neglects to tell him that it was not Nick's own idea. Nigel wants to do "The Brothers from Cornwall", the story of the two brothers' lives, but Nick vetoes saying it has to be bigger, and decides to do a play about the Black Death. The troupe performs a song for Lord Clapham (”The Black Death”), who is disgusted and deserts the troupe.

Nigel sits down to try to write a new play. Portia sneaks out to see him, and they discover more about their similarities, especially in the way they both love poetry ("I Love the Way"). A messenger arrives with an invitation for Nigel to attend Shakespeare in the Park and an after-party. Nigel explains to Portia that he sent one of his sonnets to the Bard for feedback. Nigel asks the messenger if Portia can be his "plus one".

In the park, Shakespeare performs for the people ("Will Power"). Nigel and Portia go to the after party, where Portia gets drunk. Shakespeare asks to read Nigel's journal of poems and writings, but Nick runs in with Shylock and chastises Shakespeare for trying to steal Nigel's ideas, as well as reprimanding Nigel for his naiveté. Brother Jeremiah then runs in to find a drunk Portia and once again admonishes Nigel.

In a rage, Nick goes back to Nostradamus with what he has left of the money he stole from the Money Box. He asks Nostradamus what Shakespeare's new hit is going to be. Nostradamus sees Hamlet but misinterprets it as "Omelette", among other mistakes (such as the Prince eating a danish pastry rather than being a Danish prince). Nick gets excited at the possibilities of success and dreams of a future in which crowds cheer for him and Shakespeare bows down to him ("Bottom's Gonna Be on Top").

Act II
The Minstrel welcomes the audience back and tells them of the stresses that the Bottom brothers and Shakespeare face ("Welcome to the Renaissance (Reprise)"). Shakespeare shows the stress he faces while trying to write hits and manage his fame ("Hard to Be the Bard"). A spy tells him that the brothers are trying to steal Shakespeare's upcoming hit. An excited Shakespeare decides to disguise himself as "Toby Belch" and audition for the brothers' troupe in order to steal the play.

Meanwhile, the troupe is rehearsing "Omelette: The Musical" ("It's Eggs!"). Shylock has become their new investor, though they cannot find a title that would make his role legal. When some of the actors become suspicious of Nostradamus and why he is at their theatre, Nick lies and says that Nostradamus is an actor. "Toby Belch" arrives at the theatre and is hired for the company. He is surprised to learn that his hit is about eggs.

Nigel sneaks out to London Bridge to see Portia, where he reads her another poem about his love for her. He worries about their future together, but Portia reassures him by saying that everyone, even Nick and Brother Jeremiah, will change their minds about their relationship when they hear Nigel's beautiful sonnets ("We See the Light"). Nigel is not very happy with "Omelette" and claims that it doesn't feel right. Brother Jeremiah interrupts the lovers and takes Portia away to be imprisoned in a tower for disobeying. Saddened by the loss of his love, Nigel becomes inspired to write a completely different play that is revealed to be Hamlet.

Nigel goes into the theatre the next day and tells Nick about his new improvements. They get into a huge argument and Shakespeare tries to take advantage of their squabble to get his hit ("To Thine Own Self"). A hurt Nigel scrambles out onto the street and is confronted by Shakespeare, who steals his hit under the guise of "improving it". Later, Nigel runs into Bea, who explains to him that they should still trust Nick because they can always fall on him if they need him ("Right Hand Man" (Reprise)).

Nick is having qualms about "Omelette: The Musical" as well, but dismisses these doubts once he learns that the town lined up all the way around the theatre for tickets. He and the troupe prepare for the show ("Something Rotten!"). Once the audience arrives, they perform a bombastic dance number that has many references to modern-day musicals (such as The Lion King and The Phantom of the Opera) ("Make an Omelette"). Towards the end of the number, Shakespeare reveals himself and sues the brothers. The troupe and Nigel find out that Nostradamus is a soothsayer, and are horrified.

In court, Shylock, Nick, Nigel, and Nostradamus are on trial and Nick is sentenced to beheading. Bea enters, disguised as a lawyer, and makes Nick confess that he stole from the Money Box. She tells the judge that beheading him would be redundant because he has already lost his head. She has made a deal with Shakespeare that they will be exiled to America ("To Thine Own Self (Reprise)"). She says that they always wanted a new country house and they are getting a house in a new country. Portia then arrives, having escaped the tower. She renounces her father's ideals and joins the Bottoms, Shylock, and Nostradamus in exile.

They arrive in America and tell the audience of the new opportunities in the New World ("Finale"). Nick hears about the opening of Shakespeare's new masterpiece, Hamlet, to which Nostradamus replies "I was this close".

Music

Musical numbers
Source:

Act I
 "Welcome to the Renaissance" – Minstrel and Company
 "God, I Hate Shakespeare" – Nick, Nigel and The Troupe
 "Right Hand Man" – Bea, Nick, Nigel
 "God, I Hate Shakespeare (Reprise)" – Nick
 "A Musical" – Nostradamus, Nick and Ensemble
 "The Black Death" – Nick, Nigel and The Troupe
 "I Love the Way" – Portia and Nigel
 "Will Power" – Shakespeare and Ensemble
 "Bottom's Gonna Be on Top" – Nick and Company

Act II
 "Welcome to the Renaissance (Reprise)" – Minstrel
 "Hard to Be the Bard" – Shakespeare and Ensemble
 "It's Eggs!" – Nick and The Troupe
 "We See the Light" – Portia, Nigel, Brother Jeremiah, Nick, Ensemble
 "Nigel's Theme" – Nigel 
 "To Thine Own Self" – Nigel, Nick, Shakespeare and The Troupe
 "Right Hand Man (Reprise)" – Bea
 "Something Rotten!" – The Troupe
 "Make an Omelette" – Nick and Company
 "To Thine Own Self (Reprise)" – Nick and Nigel 
 "Finale" – The Company

Recording
Ghostlight Records released the Original Broadway Cast Album of Something Rotten! on June 2, 2015 in digital music stores and July 17, 2015 on CD.

In the recording, "Something Rotten!" and "Make an Omelette" are combined into one track because of the brevity of the former.

Musical references
The show includes references to numerous musicals. For example, during the song “A Musical,” "Nostradamus and the chorus men don sailor hats, which harkens to several nautical-themed musicals, including South Pacific, Anything Goes, On the Town and Dames at Sea." The TheaterMania reviewer noted that the song "A Musical" "encapsulates the entire book-musical form in six hilarious minutes. It's so chock-full of witty references and energetic dance; it's hard to see how it could be topped."
Variety also pointed out that the song "A Musical" "simultaneously celebrates and sends up everything we hold dear about this peculiar art form, from the 'jazzy hands' of Bob Fosse to the synchronized line dancing of the Rockettes."

Characters and cast
The original casts are as follows:

Notable Broadway Replacements 

 Nick Bottom: Rob McClure
 William Shakespeare: Will Chase, Adam Pascal
 Nigel Bottom: Josh Grisetti
 Bea: Leslie Kritzer
 Lord Clapham/Master of the Justice: Edward Hibbert

Awards and honors

Original Broadway Production

References

External links

MTI entry

2015 musicals
Broadway musicals
Plays set in London
Plays set in the 16th century
Cultural depictions of William Shakespeare
Original musicals
Tony Award-winning musicals